''Master'' Haja Sheriff (born Khaja Sheriff) is an Indian actor, who primarily worked in Tamil cinema (Kollywood). He has worked in popular movies like Uthiripookkal, Suvarilladha Chiththirangal, Andha 7 Naatkal. He debuted in the 1979 film Puthiya Vaarpugal.

Film career 
His debut film was Uthiripookkal. Although he has starred in films such as Uthiripookkal the most famous film of his One of the most popular films of all time is the film Andha 7 Naatkal by K. bhagyaraj. K Bhagyaraj starred in the movie Andha 7 Naatkal in which Bhagyaraj played the role of Palakkattu Madhavan. In it he became a disciple. Haja Sheriff  is the guy who appeared as a Dholak boy. His notable film such as Uthiripookkal, SuvarIllatha Chithirangal, Andha 7 Naatkal

Present 
Now at present  Haja Sheriff is not acting in any film. He is currently working as star night program organizer in countries such as Malaysia, Dubai, Canada and the USA.

Filmography 
This is a partial filmography. You can expand it.

1970s

1980s

1990s

2000s

References

External links 
 https://www.imdb.com/name/nm10251021/

Indian male film actors
Male actors in Tamil cinema
Tamil comedians
Year of birth missing (living people)
Living people